Ami Koita (Djoliba, 1952), nicknamed "the diva of Mandinga music", is a Malian singer.

Biography 
She was born in a village called Djoliba, in the center-west of the French Sudan (colony of the French Empire between 1879 and 1960), 40 km southwest of Bamako (capital of Mali), in the heart of sent deep in the banks of the Niger River and a few hours walk from Guinea. Her family had a long tradition of yelis (or griots: bards, poets and street narrators), in the Mandinga culture (and within it the Bambara).

Her mother came from Kirimadon de la magna, site of the famous battle of Emperor Sundiata Keita (1190-1255) in the thirteenth century. Her father, Bengaly Fode Koita, a pure-line traditionalist, was well-known in Mali for his contribution to narrating the events of the historical kings, such as Sundiata Keita, of the different battles waged by the warlords like Samory Touré (1830-1900), Babemba (king of Sikasso), Tiramangan Traoré, Fakoly Dumbia (thirteenth century), El Hadj Umar Tall, etc.

Both her father and her mother were griots. Her father, to save the life of the old chief of the Djoliba village, vowed that if the chief died he would never sing again in his life. So Amy never heard her father sing. Her father died when she was three years old. On the death of her father, she moved to Bamako with her mother, but always maintained a close bond with Djoliba.

Her grandmother, who died centenarians in 1992, was a constant source of inspiration and a model of Mandinga culture. 
Her uncle Wa Kamissoko, brother of his mother, was a historian of international fame for having written about the history of the Mandingas, and was published under the title Les grandes gestes du Mali ('the great deeds of Mali'), by Youssouf Tata Cissé (1935-2013). From her mother she learned how to sing and how to make vocal fluctuations so important for griots. From her grandmother she learned behavior, sensitivity and respect for tradition. From her uncle, Wa Kamissoko, she learned the stories of her people, without deformations.

Discography
Bomboli Niaré (1976)
Néné Daou (1978)
Amy Koita (1985) LP SP 1001
Tata Sira (1986) CD Mélodie 42079-2
Nakan (1988) CD Mali Stars Mélodie 38115-2
Mamaya (1989) CD Mélodie 38120-2
Mory Djo (1989)
Djamba Kono (1992)
Songs of praise (1993) Stern's Africa STCD 1039
Carthage (1995) CD Sonodisc CDS 6840
Djiguy (1998) CD Déclic 8459132
Sarama (2000) K7 SA-SN 0012
Africawé (2003)

References

1952 births
Living people
20th-century Malian women singers
People from Koulikoro Region
21st-century Malian women singers